This is a list of notable Nepali people.

Academics 
 Harka Gurung, geologist, anthropologist, and author
 Gautama V. Vajracharya, historian

Artists 

Sushma Shakya, artist
 Ragini Upadhyaya, fine artist and lyricist

Athletes

Cricketers

Footballers

Swimmers
 Gaurika Singh
 Karishma Karki
 Sofia Shah
 Sirish Gurung

Other athletes 
 Mohan Bam, judo practitioner
 Deepak Bista, taekwondo practitioner
 Shyam Dhakal, alpine skier
 Sipora Gurung, volleyball player
 Jayaram Khadka, cross-country skier
 Mandil Pradhan, mountain biker
 Manikala Rai, ultramarathon runner
 Dachhiri Sherpa, cross-country skier
 Bimala Tamang, karateka
 Devu Thapa, judo practitioner
 Mira Rai, ultramarathon runner

Entertainment

Actors

Filmmakers
 Dayaram Dahal
 Hari Bansha Acharya
 Subash Gajurel
 Tulsi Ghimire
 Manisha Koirala
 Nischal Basnet
 Priyanka Karki
 Saugat Malla
 Rekha Thapa
 Deepa Shree Niraula

Singers

Other entertainers
 Atul Gautam, tabla player
 Hom Nath Upadhyaya, tabla player
 Prabal Gurung, fashion designer
 Teriya Magar, dancer and reality TV show winner
 Santosh Shah, celebrity chef

Entrepreneurs
 Binod Chaudhary, businessman, industrialist, and philanthropist
 Karna Shakya, businessman, industrialist, and philanthropist

Humanitarians
 Pushpa Basnet, founder of Nepal's Early Childhood Development Center
 Anil Chitrakar, founder of Environmental Camps for Conservation Awareness
 Sunita Danuwar, founder of Shakti Samuha, an anti-sex trafficking organization
 Tikendra Dal Dewan, retired British Army Gurkha, campaigner for Gurkha welfare
 Durga Ghimire, founder of ABC Nepal, an anti-sex trafficking organization
 Jagadish Ghimire, political analyst, founder of Tamakoshi Sewa Samiti community development organization
 Angur Baba Joshi, education activist and first female school principal in Nepal
 Daya Bir Singh Kansakar, founder of Paropakar Organization, Nepal's first social service organization
 Anuradha Koirala, founder of Maiti Nepal, which supports victims of sex trafficking
 Harsha Bahadur Budha Magar, social worker and scholar
 Sarina Prabasi, CEO of WaterAid America
 Mahabir Pun, founder of the Nepal Wireless Networking Project
 Indira Ranamagar, founder of Prisoner's Assistance Nepal
 Himani Shah, chairman of the Himani Trust, former crown princess of Nepal
 Tara Devi Tuladhar, social worker and education activist

Mountaineers

Politicians

Royal and former ruling family 

 Princess Jayanti of Nepal
 Princess Jyotshana Basnyat of Nepal
 Queen Tripurasundari of Nepal

Scientists 
 Drona Prakash Rasali, veterinarian
 Bodhraj Acharya, biochemist
 Sushila Maharjan, biochemist, biotechnologist
 Lujendra Ojha, planetary scientist

Writers

Poets

Journalists

Playwrights

Prose writers

Other notables
 Bhawana Ghimire, CEO of Cricket Association of Nepal from 2014 to 2016